Surrender of Santa Anna is an 1886 painting by William Henry Huddle, displayed at the Texas State Capitol in Austin, Texas, United States.

See also
 1886 in art

References

External links
 

1886 paintings
Paintings in Austin, Texas